Cudweed is a common name for several species, and may refer to:

Plants
in the family Asteraceae
 Gamochaeta, a plant genus with species in North and South America
 Gnaphalium, a plant genus with species in Eurasia and the Americas
 Filago, a plant genus in Eurasia and North America
 Pseudognaphalium, a plant genus native to North America
 Euchiton, a plant genus native to Australasia and the Pacific
 Helichrysum, a plant genus occurring in Africa, Australasia and Eurasia. (e.g. Helichrysum luteoalbum, common name woody cudweed)

Animals
 Cucullia gnaphalii, a moth in the family Noctuidae